Elaine Stritch is an American actress of the stage and screen.

Over her 70-year career on stage and screen she has received various awards and nominations for her performances including a Tony Award, four Primetime Emmy Awards, three Drama Desk Awards, and two Obie Awards. In 1995 she was inducted into the American Theatre Hall of Fame. She also received a Grammy Award, BAFTA Award, and two Laurence Olivier Award nominations.

She received five Tony Award nominations for her performances in the William Inge play Bus Stop (1956), the  Noël Coward musical Sail Away (1962), the Stephen Sondheim musical Company (1971), and for the revival of the Edward Albee play A Delicate Balance (1996). Her one-woman show Elaine Stritch at Liberty won the 2002 Tony Award for Best Special Theatrical Event.

Major associations

Tony Awards

Emmy Awards

Grammy Awards

Industry awards

British Academy Television Award

Drama Desk Award

Drama League Award

Lucille Lortel Award

New York Drama Critics' Circle Award

Obie Award

Outer Critics Circle Award

Laurence Olivier Award

References 

Lists of awards received by American actor
Lists of awards received by American musician